This is a list of New Mexico suffragists, suffrage groups and others associated with the cause of women's suffrage in New Mexico.

Groups 

 Albuquerque Suffrage Club.
 New Mexico State Federation of Women's Clubs.
 New Mexico Women's Suffrage League.

Suffragists 

 Julia Duncan Brown Asplund (Albuquerque).
 Marguerite Baca.
 Grace Thorpe Bear (Roswell).
 Trinidad Cabeza de Baca (Santa Fe).
 Florence Moss Carr (Portales).
Margaret Cartwright.
 Ina Sizer Cassidy (Santa Fe).
 Dolores Chávez de Armijo (Santa Fe).
 Harriet Grace Donohoo (Tucumcarli).
 Emma Morgan Fall.
Isabella Muro Ferguson.
 Jennie Fortune (Socorro).
 Laura Frenger (Las Cruces).
Kate Hall.
 Anna Larkin (Las Vegas).
 Deane Lindsey (Portales).
 Aurora Lucero-White Lea (Las Vegas).
 Margaret Kent Medler (Albuquerque).
 Ada McPherson Morley (Datil).
 Nina Otero-Warren (Santa Fe).
Ellen J. Palen.
 Alida Sims (Albuquerque).
 Clara Strong (Albuquerque).
Ella St. Clair Thompson.
Ann Webster.
 Isabel Wilson (Albuquerque).

Suffragists who campaigned in New Mexico 

 Carrie Chapman Catt.
Laura M. Johns.
 Anne Martin.
 Jessie A. Russell.
 Ella St. Clair Thompson.
 Jessie Hardy Stubbs.
 Mabel Vernon.

Politicians supporting suffrage 

 Albert Fall.
 Andrieus Aristieus Jones (Socorro).
 William B. Walton.

See also 

 Timeline of women's suffrage in New Mexico
 Women's suffrage in New Mexico
Women's suffrage in states of the United States
 Women's suffrage in the United States

References

Sources 

 

 

New Mexico suffrage

New Mexico suffragists
Activists from New Mexico
History of New Mexico
Suffragists